Daniel "Dani" Shmulevich-Rom שמולביץ) was an Israeli footballer.

Biography
Dani Shmulevich-Rom played for the Maccabi Haifa F.C. from 1957 to 1973. He was known by his ability to play several positions.

He died on 18 January 2021 after a long battle with cancer at the age of 80.

References

External links
  Profile and biography of Dani Shmulevich-Rom on Maccabi Haifa's official website
 https://web.archive.org/web/20110721140214/http://www.mhaifa.co.il/TheClub/player.asp?id=157

1940 births
2021 deaths
Israeli Jews
Israeli footballers
Association football forwards
Footballers from Haifa
Maccabi Haifa F.C. players
Israel international footballers
1968 AFC Asian Cup players
1970 FIFA World Cup players
Deaths from cancer in Israel
Israeli people of Russian-Jewish descent